Schuylkill Gap is a water gap through Blue Mountain located about 3 miles north of Hamburg, Pennsylvania. The borough of Port Clinton, Pennsylvania resides within the gap itself.

Formed in much the same way as Pennsylvania's other water gaps, Schuylkill Gap is near Hawk Mountain, Weiser State Forest, and some State Game Lands. PA Route 61 as well as the Schuylkill River pass through the gap.

See also
 Geology of Pennsylvania

References

Water gaps of Pennsylvania
Landforms of Berks County, Pennsylvania
Landforms of Schuylkill County, Pennsylvania